
1930s – 1940s – 1950s – 1960s – 1970s – 1980s – 1990s – 2000s – 2010s

1930s
1938

1938
Jeanne d'Arc du Soudan, later Bamako, the early club established

1940s
1945

1945
Mamahira AC founded

1950s
1950 – 1951 – 1952 – 1953 – 1955 – 1956 – 1959

1950
Jeanne d'Arc de Bamako won their first Coupe de Soudan

1951
Jeanne d'Arc de Bamako won their second Coupe du Soudan

1952
Jeanne d'Arc de Bamako won their third Coupe du Soudan

1953
Jeanne d'Arc de Bamako won their first French West African Cup title

1955
Jeanne d'Arc de Bamako won their fourth and final Coupe du Soudan

1956
Jeanne d'Arc de Bamako won their second and last French West African Cup

1959
The early Coupe du Mali held its last edition

1960s
1960 – 1961 – 1962 – 1963 – 1964 – 1965 – 1966 – 1967 – 1968 – 1969

1960
Cercle Olympique de Bamako (COB) football club founded
Djoliba AC founded after a merger with Africa Sport and Foyer du Soudan.
AS Real Bamako sports club founded
Stade Malien de Bamako founded after a merger of Jeanne d'Arc and Espérance de Bamako
Mali declared independence from France

1961
Stade Malien won their first national cup title

1962
Real Bamako won their first national cup title

1963
Stade Malien won their second national cup title

1964
Real Bamako won their second national cup title

1965
USFAS Bamako sports club founded
Djoliba AC won their first national cup title
The Malian Olympic team finishes 2nd in the African games of Brazzaville

1966
Malian Regional Championships established, it is now called the Premier Division
Real Bamako won their third national cup title
Djoliba AC became the first club to win a championship title

1967
Real Bamako won their fourth national cup title
Djoliba AC won their second championship title for Mali

1968
Real Bamako won their fifth national cup title
Djoliba AC won their third championship title for Mali

1969
AS Real Bamako became the second club in the nation to get a championship title, also they won their sixth national cup title

1970s
1970 – 1971 – 1972 – 1973 – 1974 – 1975 – 1976 – 1977 – 1978 – 1979

1970
Stade Malien became the third and recent club in the nation to get a championship title
Stade Malien won their third national cup title

1971
Djoliba AC won their fourth national championship title
Djoliba AC won their second national cup title

1972
Stade Malien won their fourth national cup title
Stade Malien won their second national championship title
The national team of mali finishes 2nd the cup of africa of the nations which takes place in cameroon

1973
Djoliba AC won their third national cup title
Djoliba AC won their fifth national championship title

1974
Djoliba AC won their fourth national cup title
Djoliba AC won their sixth national championship title

1975
Djoliba AC won their fifth national cup title
Djoliba AC won their seventh national championship title

1976
Djoliba AC won their sixth national cup title
Djoliba AC won their eighth national championship title

1977
Djoliba won their seventh national cup title
No national championship took place for the next two seasons

1978
Djoliba won their eighth national cup title

1979
AS Nianan founded
AS Sigui founded
Djoliba won their ninth national cup title
Djoliba AC won their ninth national championship title

1980s
1980 – 1981 – 1982 – 1983 – 1984 – 1985 – 1986 – 1987 – 1988 – 1989

1980
Real Bamako won their  seventh national cup title
AS Real Bamako won their second national championship title

1981
Djoliba won their tenth national cup title
AS Real Bamako won their third national championship title

1982
Stade Malien won their fifth national cup title
Djoliba won their tenth national championship title

1983
Djoliba AC won their 11th national cup title
AS Real Bamako won their fourth national championship title

1984
Stade Malien won their sixth national cup title
Stade Malien won their third national championship title

1985
Stade Malien won their seventh national cup title
Djoliba AC won their eleventh national championship title

1986
Stade Malien won their eighth national cup title
AS Real Bamako won their fifth national championship title

1987
AS Sigui won their only cup title, the fourth club to get an official football honour
Stade Malien won their fourth national championship title

1988
Stade Malien won their ninth national cup title
Djoliba AC won their 12th national championship title

1989
AS Bakaridjan sports club founded
Real Bamako won their eighth national cup title
Stade Malien won their fifth national championship title

1990s
1990 – 1991 – 1992 – 1993 – 1994 – 1995 – 1996 – 1997 – 1998 – 1999

1990
Stade Malien won their 10th national cup title
Djoliba AC won their 13th national championship title

1991
Real Bamako won their ninth national cup title
AS Real Bamako won their sixth and last national championship title

1992
Stade Malien won their 11th national cup title
Djoliba AC won their 14th national championship title
Stade Malien won their only WAFU Club Championship title

1993
Centre Salif Keita football club founded
Djoliba won their 12th national cup title
Stade Malien won their sixth national championship title
Djoliba won their first national super cup title

1994
Stade Malien won their 12th national cup title
Stade Malien won their seventh national championship title
Djoliba won their second national super cup title
The national team of football finishes 4th at the cup of Africa of the nations in Tunisia

1995
USFAS Bamako won their only national cup title and became the fifth club to get an official football honour
Stade Malien won their eighth national championship title
No Super Cup competitions taken place for the next two seasons

1996
Djoliba won their 13th national cup title
Djoliba AC won their 15th national championship title

1997
Stade Malien won their 13th national cup title
Djoliba AC won their 16th national championship title
Djoliba AC won their third national super cup title

1998
Djoliba won their 14th national cup title
Djoliba AC won their 17th national championship title
Stade Malien won their first national super cup title

1999
AS Bamako football club founded
Stade Malien won their 14th national cup title
Djoliba AC won their 18th national championship title
Djoliba AC won their fourth national super cup title
The national team under 20 finishes at the 3rd place of the world cup held in Nigeria and the player Seydou Keita receives the prize of the best player of the tournament

2000s
2000 – 2001 – 2002 – 2003 – 2004 – 2005 – 2006 – 2007 – 2008 – 2009

2000
Cercle Olympique de Bamako (COB) won their first national cup title and became the seventh club to get an official football honour
Stade Malien won their ninth regional championship title
Stade Malien won their second national super cup

2001
Stade Malien won their 15th national cup title
Stade Malien won their tenth regional championship title
Stade Malien won their third national super cup

2002
Cercle Olympique won their second national cup title
Stade Malien won their 11th regional championship title
The national football team finished 4th at the Africa Cup of Nations as host country
No Super Cup competitions took place for the next three seasons

2003
Djoliba won their 15th national cup title
Stade Malien won their 12th regional championship title

2004
Djoliba won their 16th national cup title
Djoliba AC won their 19th national championship title
The Mali finishes fourth of the cup of Africa of the nations which is held in Tunisia

2005
AS Bamako won their only national cup title and became the eighth club to get an official football honour
Stade Malien won their 13th national championship title
Stade Malien won their fourth national super cup title

2006
Stade Malien won their 16th national cup title
Stade Malien won their 14th national championship title
Stade Malien won their fifth national super cup title

2007
Djoliba won their 17th national cup title
Stade Malien won their 15th national championship title
Stade Malien won their sixth national super cup title

2008
Djoliba won their 18th national cup title
Djoliba AC won their 20th national championship title
Djoliba AC won their fifth national super cup title
Jeanne d'Arc de Bamako founded after a separation from Stade Malien
In the 44th minute of the match of the Bamako District's Mayor Cup, Djoliba supporters rioted, attacking officials, other fans, and journalists.  The match was called off, and several days later, awarded to Stade.  Djoliba were fined 500,000 FCFA, all payments for previous matches were withdrawn, and they were excluded form the 2009 competition. Stade received the trophy and a 750,000 F Cfa award from the Mayor of Bamako Adama Sangaré on 23 September.

2009
US Bougouni sports club founded
Djoliba won their 19th and recent national cup title
Djoliba AC won their 21st national championship title
Stade Malien became the only Malian club to have a CAF Confederation Cup title
Stade Malien won their seventh national super cup title

2010s
2010 – 2011 – 2012 – 2013 – 2014 – 2015 – 2016 – 2017

2010
Real Bamako won their seventh and recent national cup title
Stade Malien won their 16th national championship title
Stade Malien won their eighth national super cup title

2011
Cercle Olympique won their third and recent national cup title
Stade Malien won their 17th national championship title
Cercle Olympique won their only national super cup title

2012
US Bougouni won their only national cup title and became the ninth club to get an official football honour
Djoilba AC won their 22nd and recent national championship title
Djoliba AC won their sixth national super cup title
The national football team finished in the 3rd place of the Africa Cup of Nations after beating the Ghana in the match for the 3rd (2-0).

2013
Stade Malien won their 17th national cup title
Stade Malien won their 18th national championship title
Djoliba AC won their seventh and recent national super cup title
The national football team finished in the 3rd place of the African Cup of Nations after beating the Ghana in the match for the 3rd (3-1).

2014
Onze Créateurs de Niaréla won their first national cup title and became the tenth and recent club to get an official football honour
Stade Malien won their 19th national championship title
Stade Malien won their ninth national super cup title

2015
Stade Malien won their 18th and recent national cup title
Stade Malien won their 20th national championship title
Stade Malien won their tenth and recent super cup title
The National Under-20 Team finished third in the World Cup in New Zealand after defeating Senegal (3-1) and Adama Traoré was awarded the Best Player of the Tournament award
The national selection u17 becomes the first selection Mali any age categories confused to win a continental title after having disposed of South Africa by 2 goal to zero in final
The U17 selection finishes 2nd in the World Cup held in Chile. The Malian Aly Malle finished 3rd best player of the tournament and the player Samuel Diarra obtains the reward of the best guardian of the tournament

2016
Onze Créateurs de Niaréla won their second and recent national cup title
Stade Malien won their 21st and recent national championship title
Onze Créateus won their only national super cup title

2017
the President of Mali dissolved the Malian Football Federation for two months, the Malien Premier Division went to a two month halt.
FIFA banned the Malian Football Federation from competition from March 10 to early May which meant all clubs including Djoilba were banned from competing at the CAF Champions League and the CAF Confederation Cup
the 2017 Malian Premier Division resumes in early May after nearly two months of cancellation
The U17 selection retains its title of African champion by beating the Ghana in final by the score of 1 goal to 0. Alassane Diaby is named best player of the competition
October 29: Five clubs AS Bamako, Centre Salif Kéïta, Bamako, Djoliba and Duguwolofila refused to play in the 21st and 22nd rounds
November 8: After the date, no further Premier Division matches were played
December: Premier Division abandoned, no title awarded, no clubs relegated

See also
Timeline of association football

References

Football in Mali
Mali Football
Football